Pedro Tabaner Nadal (11 November 1946 – 5 June 2021) was a Spanish footballer who played as a defender.

Taberner played in the Spanish League for Celta Vigo and Real Mallorca.

References

1946 births
2021 deaths
Footballers from Palma de Mallorca
Spanish footballers
Association football defenders
CD Atlético Baleares footballers
RCD Mallorca players
RC Celta de Vigo players
La Liga players
Segunda División players